Francisco Miguel Conceição Roque Neto (born 11 July 1981), known as Francisco Neto or simply Neto, is a Portuguese football manager, currently the head coach of the Portugal women's national football team. For the first time, he led the Portugal national team to Euro 2017.

References

External links

1981 births
Living people
Portuguese football managers
Women's national association football team managers
Portuguese expatriate sportspeople in India
Portuguese expatriate football managers
Sportspeople from Viseu District
UEFA Women's Euro 2022 managers